C

Early life
Born James Hawthorne in Yemassee, South Carolina, Bey moved with his family to Brooklyn and then to Harlem, where he began playing drums and singing in church choirs. He also served in the Navy during World War II and later attended cosmetology school.

Later life and career
In the 1950s, Bey performed in an international tour of Porgy and Bess starring Leontyne Price and Cab Calloway. He also began a busy recording career, performing on Herbie Mann's At the Village Gate (1961), Art Blakey's The African Beat (1962), Ahmed Abdul-Malik's Sounds of Africa (New Jazz, 1961), as well as albums by Harry Belafonte, Miriam Makeba and Pharoah Sanders, among others. He took his stage name after joining the Moorish Science Temple of America, a Muslim sect. Then he taught the shekere, a West African percussion instrument, at the Griot Institute at Intermediate School 246 in Brooklyn.

Bey died at his home in Brooklyn of stomach cancer at the age of 91. His widow, Barbara Kenyatta Bey (born Barbara Ann Coleman in Harlem on June 9, 1944), was a priestess of  Yemaja in the Yoruba religion. She collapsed at his funeral and died four days later.

Discography

As leader
 Children of the House of God (Mapleshade, 1997)

As sideman
With Hamiet Bluiett
 Orchestra, Duo & Septet (Chiaroscuro, 1977)
 Dangerously Suite (Soul Note, 1981)
 Nali Kola (Soul Note, 1989)
 Bearer of the Holy Flame (Black Fire, 1994)
 Bluiett's Barbeque Band (Mapleshade, 1996)
 Live at Carlos 1 (Just a Memory, 1997)
 Live at Carlos 1: Another Night (Just a Memory, 1997)
 Live at Carlos 1: Last Night (Just a Memory, 1998)

With Babatunde Olatunji
 Zungo! (Columbia, 1961)
 High Life! (Columbia, 1963)
 Drums! Drums! Drums! (Roulette, 1964)

With others
 Ahmed Abdul-Malik, Sounds of Africa (New Jazz, 1962)
 Ray Barretto, Mysterious Instinct (Charlie Parker, 1962)
 Harry Belafonte & Miriam Makeba, An Evening with Belafonte/Makeba (RCA Victor, 1965)
 Art Blakey, The African Beat (Blue Note, 1962)
 Solomon Ilori, African High Life (Blue Note, 1963)
 Herbie Mann, Herbie Mann at the Village Gate (Atlantic, 1962)
 Herbie Mann, Herbie Mann Returns to the Village Gate (Atlantic, 1963)
 Miriam Makeba, Makeba Sings! (RCA Victor, 1965)
 Howard Roberts, Lord Shango (Bryan, 1975)
 Pharoah Sanders, Thembi (ABC Impulse!, 1971)
 Pharoah Sanders, Izipho Zam (My Gifts) (Strata-East, 1973)
 Warren Smith, Cats Are Stealing My $hit (Mapleshade, 1998)
 Guy Warren, Themes for African Drums (RCA Victor, 1959)
 Randy Weston, Khepera (Verve, 1998)
 Judd Woldin, Raisin (Columbia, 1973)
 World Saxophone Quartet, Metamorphosis (Elektra Nonesuch, 1991)
 World Saxophone Quartet, Selim Sivad. Tribute to Miles Davis with African Drums (Justin Time, 1998)

References

Jo Anna Hunter Iyanifa Omotinuwe, My Journey To Aganjú: The Orisa so Hard to Find http://www.blackmadonnaenterprises.com

External links
Chief Bey discography
Chief Bey at allmusic.com

1913 births
2004 deaths
American jazz drummers
United States Navy personnel of World War II
People from Yemassee, South Carolina
Musicians from Brooklyn
Deaths from cancer in New York (state)
Deaths from stomach cancer
20th-century American drummers
American male drummers
Jazz musicians from New York (state)
20th-century American male musicians
American male jazz musicians
African-American drummers
20th-century African-American musicians